Aplocera praeformata, known as the purple treble-bar, is a species of moth in the family Geometridae.

Subspecies
Subspecies include: 
 Aplocera praeformata gibeauxi Leraut, 1995
 Aplocera praeformata praeformata (Hübner, 1826)
 Aplocera praeformata urbahni Dufay, 1981

Distribution and habitat
This species is present from the Iberian Peninsula and France, through Western Europe, over Central Europe, to Russia. Its northernmost range is southern Finland and the Baltic States.   The subspecies Aplocera praeformata urbahni is found in Greece. In the Alps it is found to heights of up to 2,000 meters.

Description

Aplocera praeformata has a wingspan of 34–44 mm. The forewings have a gray to blue-gray basic color. They show various bands of dark transverse lines. A red-brown stain extends towards the wing tip. The hind wings are monochrome gray-white without any drawing. 

This species is rather similar to Aplocera plagiata.

Biology
Adults are on the wing from June to August.  This species has one generation a year univoltine. The caterpillars are gray-brown, with a white side line and a dark lower edge.  The larvae feed on Hypericum species (St. John's worts), such as Hypericum maculatum and Hypericum perforatum.

References

External links
Lepiforum.de
 INPN

Aplocera
Moths of Europe
Taxa named by Jacob Hübner